Hartwood Acres is a  county park in Allegheny County, Pennsylvania in the United States. Hartwood is considered the crown jewel of the county's  network of nine distinct parks.

Purchased by the county in 1969, its special feature is one of the largest and most spectacular country estates in the region. Hartwood consists of a stately Tudor mansion (begun in 1927 and completed in  1929), an English style Formal Garden, a cottage, a stable complex, and a gate lodge (erected in 1927). The mansion, designed by Alfred Hopkins for John and Mary Flinn Lawrence, houses a collection of original English and American antiques.

Hartwood is especially well-known because of its now-defunct "Festival of Lights," a large outdoor light display once held during the holiday season to benefit local charities.

History
Mary Flinn Lawrence, a Pittsburgh philanthropist, created Hartwood with money she inherited from her father, Senator William Flinn. In the 1920s, she and her husband John Lawrence asked architect Alfred Hopkins to borrow design elements from a manor house the Lawrences had seen in Broadway, Oxfordshire, England. The result was a stately 31-room slate-roofed stone house constructed around a great hall.

Mary transformed the grounds of her estate into an equestrian arts showcase, building riding trails that extend for miles, show rings, steeplechase layouts, and ivy-covered stables. The stalls of the stables are made of varnished oak.

The Allegheny Parks Commission bought  of land and riding trails from Mary (John died in 1945) in 1969, with several stipulations. 1) Mary was to be able to remain in residence until her death as were her servants, 2) The land would never be subdivided, and 3) the county would also purchase her sister Edith's home, which was called Harkaway Farm (This is now the area called the Middle Road Concert Area where the amphitheater is located). Mary died on October 29, 1974, and in 1976 the new park was opened to the public.

Usage in popular culture
A large segment of the 1996 TV film The Christmas Tree, directed by Sally Field, was filmed at Hartwood.

Some scenes in the 2006 film 10th & Wolf were filmed in the Hartwood Mansion's great hall.

The pilot episode for the cancelled Twentieth Century Fox Television adaptation of Joe Hill's Eisner Award-winning graphic novel, Locke & Key, was filmed at the Hartwood Mansion in early 2011.

Scenes from the 2014 blockbuster The Fault in our Stars were filmed near the Middle Road entrance to the park.

Scenes from the 2022 Netflix film The Pale Blue Eye feature the Hartwood stables as well as exterior shots of the Hartwood Mansion.

Sculpture
Eleven large, outdoor sculptures by nationally-known artists co-exist with visitors to the park as part of the permanent collection.

Coronet, 1978, Lila Katzen
Monumental Holistic Image IV, 1980, Betty Gold
Ring Series #5, 1983, Fletcher Benton
Cloudt, 1982, Ron Bennett
Stretch, 1980–81, Charles Ginnever
Hence, 1977, Clement Meadmore
Manly, 1980, Lyman Kipp
Large Escargot, 1982, David Hayes
Mobius Trip X, 1966–83, Peter Forakis
Large Snail, 1965, Tillie Speyer
Hidden in the Obvious, Stanley Boyd Spotts
Totem, Lamina, Limbus, 1979, Jack Youngerman

Gallery

References

External links

 Hartwood Acres Park website
 Friends of Hartwood website
 Smithsonian Inventory of American Sculpture

Parks in the Pittsburgh metropolitan area
Museums in Allegheny County, Pennsylvania
Historic house museums in Pennsylvania
Parks in Allegheny County, Pennsylvania
Houses in Allegheny County, Pennsylvania
Houses completed in 1929
Pittsburgh History & Landmarks Foundation Historic Landmarks
County parks in the United States